William Irwin (born 23 July 1951) is a Northern Irish former professional footballer, currently working as director of soccer at the University of Portland and head coach of the United States women's under-23 side.

Personal life

Irwin and his wife, Liz, live in Portland with their two sons Bryan, who played for the Portland university team, and Nicholas.

Playing career

An Irish amateur international, Irwin began his career at Bangor where he was managed by Charlie Tully. During his spell at the club, he helped win the clubs first honours when they won the County Antrim Shield and the City Cup in successive seasons. Prior to his death Tully had recommended Irwin to his former club Celtic but the move never materialised and he eventually joined Welsh side Cardiff City in 1971.

Brought in to replace Frank Parsons, Irwin was thrown straight into the Cardiff side and performed admirably, including winning the 1971–1972 BBC save of the season award for a spectacular save during a 2–0 defeat in the FA Cup against Leeds United in February 1972. He also became the first Cardiff goalkeeper to be sent off during a match after receiving his marching orders against Bangor City during the 1972–73 Welsh Cup final. Irwin held the position of first choice goalkeeper for four seasons, beating off competition from Parsons and Jim Eadie, until the arrival of Ron Healey in 1974 saw him lose his place. He eventually left the club in 1978 and went to play for the Washington Diplomats in the NASL.

He went on to play at various teams in the NASL before finishing his career with two years playing indoor football in the Major Indoor Soccer League. In December 1984 he joined Irish League side Crusaders until the end of January 1985.

Coaching career

After his retirement Irwin took up an assistant manager role at the University of Portland alongside former Cardiff teammate Clive Charles. During his time at the University he has an impressive record of training goalkeepers. The five starting goalkeepers who have trained under Irwin, Greg Maas, Kasey Keller, Stuart Dobson, Scott Hileman, Curtis Spiteri and most recently Luis Robles, have all gone on to play professional football. Following the sudden death of Charles in 2003 Irwin was promoted to head coach after serving as his assistant for sixteen years.

Irwin has been involved with goalkeeper coaching throughout the US women's teams and various youth levels of the men's team and in 2007 he was appointed as head coach of the US under-23 women's team, winning the Nordic Cup in his first year.

Honours

Player
Bangor

City Cup Winner: 1
 1970–71
County Antrim Shield Winner: 1
 1969–70

Cardiff City

Welsh Cup Winner: 3
 1972–73, 1973–74, 1975–76
Welsh Cup Finalist: 2
 1971–72, 1974–75
Division Three Runner-up: 1
 1975–76

Manager
United States women's under-23

Nordic Cup Winner: 1
 2007

References

1951 births
Living people
American soccer coaches
Association footballers from Northern Ireland
Bangor F.C. players
Cardiff City F.C. players
Dallas Tornado players
Association football goalkeepers
Golden Bay Earthquakes (MISL) players
English Football League players
Major Indoor Soccer League (1978–1992) players
Minnesota Strikers (MISL) players
North American Soccer League (1968–1984) indoor players
North American Soccer League (1968–1984) players
Portland Pilots men's soccer coaches
Portland Timbers (1975–1982) players
San Jose Earthquakes (1974–1988) players
Washington Diplomats (NASL) players
Wichita Wings (MISL) players
Crusaders F.C. players